Vitali Klitschko vs. Chris Byrd, was a professional boxing match contested on 1 April 2000 for the WBO Heavyweight Championship.

Background
After knocking out Herbie Hide to win the WBO belt, Vitali Klitschko had made two stoppage defences against Ed Mahone, and Obed Sullivan. He was ranked 7th in the world by Ring magazine. He had planned to face Donovan Ruddock, however, he pulled out due to a hepatitis infection and Chris Byrd (who had been training for a bout with Lawrence Clay-Bey) stepped in at 10 days notice to take the fight.

The fight
Klitschko controlled most of the fight with Byrd being elusive and making himself a difficult target. After 9 rounds Vitali had suffered a torn rotator cuff and despite being clearly ahead on the scorecards (88-83, 88-83, & 89-82) he retired on his stool handing the win to Byrd. Harold Lederman, HBO's unofficial judge, had Klitschko ahead 88-83 at the time of the stoppage.

Aftermath
Vitali's status as a rising star of the Heavyweight division took a knock after this with HBO commentator Larry Merchant said, "He doesn’t have the mentality of a champion. I can hardly believe what I just saw." Byrd's first defence in October was against the WBO's top contender, and Vitali's younger brother Wladimir Klitschko, who avenged his brother's loss with a clear decision victory.

Broadcasting

References

2000 in boxing
Boxing in Germany
2000 in German sport
Klitschko brothers
April 2000 sports events in Europe
World Boxing Organization heavyweight championship matches
Boxing on HBO
Boxing matches